The Solano County Library is a public library system serving the cities of Dixon, Fairfield, Rio Vista, Suisun City, Vacaville and Vallejo, California. The library system consists of nine public libraries, the Solano County Law Library, and the Solano County Library Adult Literacy Program. The city of Benicia, California, while located in Solano County, has a public library that is not a part of the Solano County Library system. It is a partner of the Solano Partner Libraries & St. Helena (SPLASH) Consortium.

Solano County Library offers library materials, resources, information, entertainment and lifelong learning opportunities for the people of Solano County.

History

The Solano County Library was established in 1914 by the county's board of supervisors. For its first two decades of service the library collection was kept in various locations until a permanent building was constructed for library use in 1931.

References

External links 
Solano County Library web site
Solano County Library mobile site
Solano County web site

Solano
Buildings and structures in Solano County, California
Library